Robert Broderick was an actor in silent films and "light opera". He starred in Arizona.

Film companies he worked for include Thanhouser for one film and Dyreda Art Film.

He worked with Kinemacolor, Western Kalem (Eastern Branch), and Famous Players Company, and then the Dyreda Company, where he was leading man.

The Billboard wrote of his performance in The Redemption of David Corson (1914): "The character of Dr. Paracelsus [sic], as done by Robert Broderick, was remarkably realistic."

Filmography
King Rene's Daughter (1913), based on: King Rene's Daughter, title role
Arizona (1913), as Henry Canby
The Redemtion of David Corson (1914) as Dr. Parcelsus
Jack the Giant Killer (1914 film) writer and actor in the Thanhouser film (see also: Jack the Giant Killer)
One of Millions
In the Name of the Prince of Peace 
The Better Man (1914), as Henry Wharton
Poor Schmaltz (1915), as Mr. Hocheimer
Gambier's Advocate (1915)
Arms and the Woman (1916), as Marcus
Hit-The-Trail Holliday (1918), as Otto Wurst
The Prince and the Pauper (1915), as The King
Youth (1917), as James Goodwin
Bridges Burned (1917), as Thomas O'Brien
The Guardian (1917), as Chief Conlin
Just for Tonight (1918), as Theodore 'Ted' Whitney Sr. 
The Bishop's Emeralds (1919), as Lord John Cardew
The Rough Neck (1919), as Horace Masters
The Eternal Mother (1920)
Call of the Hills (1923)

Further reading
The Moving Picture World, December 9, 1914.

References

External links 

American male silent film actors
20th-century American male actors
Year of birth missing
Year of death missing